The 1974 Masters Tournament was the 38th Masters Tournament, held on April 11–14 at the Augusta National Golf Club in Augusta, Georgia.

Gary Player won the second of his three Masters titles at 278 (−10), two strokes ahead of runners-up Dave Stockton and Tom Weiskopf. It was the seventh of his nine major championships. Player did not enter the previous year's tournament due to leg and abdominal surgery; it was the only Masters that he missed in 53 years.

Defending champion Tommy Aaron missed the cut by two strokes. Jack Burke Jr., the 1956 champion, competed at the Masters for the final time.

Field
1. Masters champions
Tommy Aaron (8,12), George Archer, Gay Brewer (8,12), Jack Burke Jr., Billy Casper (8,11,12,13), Charles Coody, Doug Ford, Bob Goalby (8), Herman Keiser, Jack Nicklaus (2,3,4,8,9,10,11,12), Arnold Palmer (8,9,12), Gary Player (4,9,11), Sam Snead, Art Wall Jr.
Jimmy Demaret, Ralph Guldahl, Claude Harmon, Ben Hogan, Cary Middlecoff, Byron Nelson, Henry Picard, and Gene Sarazen did not play.

The following categories only apply to Americans

2. U.S. Open champions (last five years)
Johnny Miller (8,9,11), Orville Moody

Lee Trevino (3,9,11,12) did not play

3. The Open champions (last five years)
Tom Weiskopf (9,10.11,12)

4. PGA champions (last five years)
Raymond Floyd (9), Dave Stockton (8,11)

5. 1973 U.S. Amateur quarter-finalists
William C. Campbell (a), Henri DeLozier (a), Vinny Giles (6,7,a), Downing Gray (a), Billy Kratzert (a), Dick Siderowf (6,7,a), Craig Stadler (6,a), David Strawn (a)

6. Previous two U.S. Amateur and Amateur champions

7. Members of the 1973 U.S. Walker Cup team
Gary Koch (a), Mark Pfeil (a), Marty West (a)

Doug Ballenger, Danny Edwards, Jimmy Ellis, Mike Killian, and Bill Rogers forfeited their exemptions by turning professional.

8. Top 24 players and ties from the 1973 Masters Tournament
Frank Beard, Ben Crenshaw (11), Gardner Dickinson, Bob Dickson, Lou Graham (11), Hubert Green (11), Paul Harney, Babe Hiskey, Jim Jamieson, Gene Littler (11), Bobby Nichols (11), Phil Rodgers, Chi-Chi Rodríguez (12), Mason Rudolph (10), J. C. Snead (10,12), Kermit Zarley

Don January did not play

9. Top 16 players and ties from the 1973 U.S. Open
Julius Boros, Jim Colbert, Al Geiberger, Jerry Heard (11), Ralph Johnston, John Schlee, Lanny Wadkins (10,11), Larry Ziegler

10. Top eight players and ties from 1973 PGA Championship
Don Iverson, Dan Sikes

11. Winners of PGA Tour events since the previous Masters
Sam Adams, Buddy Allin, Miller Barber, Homero Blancas (12), Bert Greene, Dave Hill, Hale Irwin (12), John Mahaffey, John Schroeder, Ed Sneed, Leonard Thompson

Deane Beman did not play, as he was now serving as commissioner of the PGA Tour 

12. Members of the U.S. 1973 Ryder Cup team

13. Foreign invitations
Isao Aoki, Hugh Baiocchi, Maurice Bembridge, Bob Charles (9,11), Bruce Crampton (10,11), Bruce Devlin (8), Trevor Homer (6,a), Tony Jacklin (2,3), Graham Marsh, Peter Oosterhuis, Masashi Ozaki (8)

Numbers in brackets indicate categories that the player would have qualified under had they been American.

Round summaries

First round
Thursday, April 11, 1974

Source

Second round
Friday, April 12, 1974

Source

Third round
Saturday, April 13, 1974

Source

Final round
Sunday, April 14, 1974

Final leaderboard

Sources:

Scorecard

Cumulative tournament scores, relative to par

Source

References

External links
Masters.com – past winners and results
Augusta.com – 1974 Masters leaderboard and scorecards

1974
1974 in golf
1974 in American sports
1974 in sports in Georgia (U.S. state)
April 1974 sports events in the United States